Kaalabairavan is an Indian Tamil-language soap opera that aired Monday through Friday on Jaya TV from 9 December 2013 to 25 August 2014 6:30PM IST for 177 episodes. The show starred Sanghavi, Ragavan and Roopa Sree among others. It was written and directed by Rajiv Priyan.

References

External links
 
Jaya TV on Youtube
Kaalabairavan on Youtube

Jaya TV television series
Tamil-language thriller television series
Tamil-language police television series
2013 Tamil-language television series debuts
Tamil-language television shows
2014 Tamil-language television series endings
2010s Tamil-language television series